Abdul Munim Riad ( 22 October 1919 – 9 March 1969) was a general and chief of staff of the Egyptian Armed Forces. Riad commanded the Jordanian forces in the 1967 Six-Day War and later commanded Egyptian forces in the War of Attrition, during which he was killed along with several of his aides in 1969.

Early life
Riad was born 22 October 1919 in the Nile Delta city of Tanta to father Mohammed Riad, a lieutenant colonel in the Egyptian military and an instructor at Royal Military Academy. After Mohammed was posted to el-Arish in the Sinai Peninsula in 1928, Riad gained an understanding of the region's mountainous and arid terrain. This part of his childhood saw Riad observing his father's military activities, playing with the local Bedouin children and becoming an "expert scout" of the area according to Egyptian military historian Mohammed al-Jawady.

Riad's family moved to the port city of Alexandria in 1930 after his father, who was promoted to colonel, was posted there to take command of the 2nd Infantry Battalion. Riad went to secondary school in the city, graduating in 1936 and attending the fall semester at Qasr el-Aini Medical School in Cairo. While there he participated in student protests demanding an end to British colonial influence in the country.

Military career
Later that year the Anglo-Egyptian Treaty was signed and stipulated that Egypt's military academies would be open to all societal classes. Riad joined the Royal Military Academy, his original interest, on 6 October despite opposition from his mother who did not favor her son having a career in the military. It was at the academy that he met fellow cadets Gamal Abdel Nasser, Anwar Sadat, Saad el-Shazly and Ahmad Ismail Ali, among others. According to al-Jawady, Riad had a particularly strong personality, understood the curriculum well and was strictly focused on strengthening his mental and physical abilities with regards to the military.

In 1938 Munim graduated with the highest marks and with a particular expertise in anti-aircraft weaponry. The dean, Colonel Futuh Bey, described Riad as "an exemplary student in all aspects; he gives his best effort and can be relied upon." Riad, then a second lieutenant, joined the newly established air defense unit in Zamalek under the command of a British captain. It was at this time that he gained more knowledge of ballistics, different kinds of anti-aircraft guns, the principles of trajectory, the arithmetic formulations to strike aerial objects and the English language.

When World War II began in late 1939 several Egyptian officers were assigned to the front lines, including Riad, now a first lieutenant, who led Egyptian anti-aircraft gun crews in Alexandria. He also served as an instructor and trainer at the Abbasia Barracks artillery school in Cairo, often personally transporting his graduates to the front in Alexandria and commanding them. Riad's wartime performance impressed his senior commanders and was among a select few who attended the General Staff College in Cairo, graduating with a masters in military science in 1944. That year, he was also posted as a permanent instructor for anti-aircraft combat at Abbasia.

Post-1952 revolution

In 1960, he was appointed Chief of Staff of the Artillery Corps. In 1961, he became the vice president of operations division under the chairmanship of staff of war and the adviser air force command for air defense. Between 1962 and 1963, as a major general, he enrolled in a special session in school of missile anti-aircraft artillery. In 1964, he became the chief of Staff of the consolidated Arab leadership. In 1966 he was promoted to a lieutenant general and received his fellowship of the Higher War College from Nasser Higher Military Academy.

Has won numerous medals and decorations, including long-service medal and a good example and the Order of Merit and the Order of the Golden degree of national rice a senior officer from Lebanon and the Jordan Globe Medallion first layer and the Order of Star of Honor.

In May 1967, after Hussein of Jordan traveled to Cairo to sign the Joint Defense Group, Riad was appointed commander of the advanced command center in Amman, and when the 1967 War broke out Lieutenant-General Riad was appointed Commander of the Front in Jordan. On 11 June 1967, he was selected as Chief of Staff of the Armed Forces and began with the Egyptian Minister of War and Commander of the armed forces, Mohamed Fawzi, to rebuild and organize the army. In 1968, he was appointed Assistant Secretary-General of the League of Arab States.

Riad achieved military victories in the battles fought by the Egyptian armed forces during the War of Attrition, such as head battle that prevented the Israeli forces from controlling the city of Port Fuad Egyptian located on the Suez Canal where a small force of infantry was able to defend the city, and the destruction of the Israeli destroyer Eilat on 21 October 1967. Also dropping some Israeli warplanes in 1967 and 1968.

Death
Riad supervised the Egyptian plan for the destruction of the Bar Lev Line, during the War of Attrition, and saw that he should oversee the implementation and set himself on Saturday, 8 March 1969 start date for the implementation of the plan. At the exact timing, the Egyptian fire erupted along the front line and the Israelis suffered the greatest losses in a few hours and the destruction of part of the Bar Lev Line positions in the heaviest artillery battles witnessed on the Suez front before 1973.

The next morning, 9 March 1969, Riad decided to go himself to the front to see closely the results of the battle. While he was there, the Israelis opened fire and an Israeli mortar round hit his position, killing him and several of his aides.

After his death, President Gamal Abdel Nasser granted him the rank of first star honors military which is the largest military decoration in Egypt, and 9 March of each year was considered the day to commemorate his memory. His name was given to one of the most famous squares in Egypt and to a street in Mohandessin, Cairo.

References

1919 births
1969 deaths
Egyptian generals
War of Attrition
People from Tanta
Egyptian Military Academy alumni
Egyptian military personnel killed in action
Chiefs of the General Staff (Egypt)